BetBoom Arena, formerly Neftyanik Stadium, is a multi-purpose stadium in Ufa, Russia.  It is currently used mostly for football matches and is the home stadium of FC Ufa.  The stadium holds 15,234 people, all seated.

The renovated stadium was inaugurated on August 9, 2015, when FC Ufa hosted the reigning Russian champions Zenit. The home team narrowly lost the game 1-0 and the only goal of the game was scored by Danny.

References

External links
Official website

Sport in Ufa
Football venues in Russia
Multi-purpose stadiums in Russia